Katarzyna Strączy (born 28 November 1979 in Kraków) is a former Polish tennis player. In her career, she won one ITF singles title and reached a ranking high of world number 215 on 1 March 1999.

Strączy played 14 rubbers for the Poland Fed Cup team.

ITF singles finals (1–2)

References 
 
 
 

1979 births
Living people
Sportspeople from Kraków
Polish female tennis players
20th-century Polish women